Ashok Kumar better known as Ashok Kushwaha is a former Member of Bihar Legislative Assembly from the Sasaram Assembly constituency. He was a member of Rashtriya Janata Dal, and was able to win from this constituency in 
2000 Bihar assembly elections as well as 2015 Bihar assembly elections. Kumar shifted his allegiance to Janata Dal (United) (JDU) in 2020 Bihar Legislative Assembly elections and was made a candidate of JDU from Sasaram constituency against Rajesh Kumar Gupta of Rashtriya Janata Dal. He was defeated in the polls of 2020. In 2015 assembly elections, Kumar had defeated Jawahar Prasad of Bhartiya Janata Party; latter was a five term Member of Legislative Assembly from the Sasaram constituency.

References

Janata Dal (United) politicians
Living people
Year of birth missing (living people)
Bihar MLAs 2015–2020
Bihar MLAs 2000–2005